Lalić may refer to:

 Lalić, Serbia, a village near Odžaci
 Lalić (surname)